Cheng Sung-gun (born 20 December 1929) is a Taiwanese former sports shooter. He competed in the trap event at the 1968 Summer Olympics.

References

External links
 

1929 births
Possibly living people
Taiwanese male sport shooters
Olympic shooters of Taiwan
Shooters at the 1968 Summer Olympics
People from Pingtung County
20th-century Taiwanese people